Chirinos is a surname. Notable people with the surname include:

Arsenio Chirinos (1934–2015), Venezuelan cyclist
Diego Andres Chirinos (born 1990), Peruvian Dog Behaviorist & Entrepreneur
Eduardo Chirinos (1960–2016), Peruvian writer and poet
Javier Chirinos (born 1960), Peruvian footballer and manager
Juan Carlos Chirinos (born 1967), Venezuelan writer
Kaisa Chirinos (born 1994), Finnish artistic gymnast
Michaell Chirinos (born 1995), Honduran professional footballer
Robinson Chirinos (born 1984), Venezuelan profession baseball catcher
Víctor Chirinos (born 1941), Venezuelan cyclist
Yonny Chirinos (born 1993), Venezuelan professional baseball pitcher

See also
Chirino

Spanish-language surnames